The 1970–71 Toronto Maple Leafs season was the 54th season of the franchise, 44th as the Maple Leafs. Norm Ullman ranked sixth in the league in the scoring with 85 points. The Leafs placed fourth in the East to qualify for the playoffs. The Leafs lost to the New York Rangers in the first round of the playoffs.

Offseason

NHL Draft

Regular season
In February, the Maple Leafs and Philadelphia Flyers swung a large trade. Toronto picked up Bernie Parent and a second-round draft choice for Bruce Gamble, Mike Walton and a first-round draft choice.

Season standings

Schedule and results

Player statistics

Regular season
Scoring

Goaltending

Playoffs
Scoring

Goaltending

Playoffs
 The New York Rangers battled the Maple Leafs in the first round of the playoffs. The Rangers took the series 4 games to 2.

Transactions
The Maple Leafs have been involved in the following transactions during the 1970–71 season.

Trades

Intra-League Draft

Free agents

Awards and records
 Dave Keon, Center, NHL Second Team All-Star
 Dave Keon, Runner up, Lady Byng Memorial Trophy
 Jacques Plante, Goaltender, NHL Second Team All-Star

References
 Maple Leafs on Hockey Database

Toronto Maple Leafs seasons
Toronto Maple Leafs season, 1970-71
Toronto